Coelinidea elegans is a wasp species in the genus Coelinidea and the family Braconidae. It is found in Europe.

References

External links 
 Coelinidea elegans on www.biolib.cz
 Coelinidea on ponent.atspace.org
 

Braconidae
Insects described in 1829